The 31st Annual Japan Record Awards took place at the Nippon Budokan in Chiyoda, Tokyo, December 31, 1989, starting at 7:00PM JST. The primary ceremonies were televised in Japan on TBS.

Award winners 
Japan Record Award:
Wink for "Samishii Nettaigyo"
Best Vocalist:
Sayuri Ishikawa
Best New Artist:
Marcia
Best Album:
Anri for "Circuit of Rainbow"
Special Honor Singer Prize:
Hibari Misora
 Lyrics Award
 Osamu Yoshioka for the song  (sung by Akari Uchida)

References

External links
Official Website

Japan Record Awards
Japan Record Awards
Japan Record Awards
Japan Record Awards
1989